Jennifer Kwan is a Canadian family physician and health care advocate, with work primarily based around the COVID-19 pandemic in Ontario.

Biography

Early life 
Kwan is based in Burlington, Ontario.

Work during the COVID-19 pandemic 
Kwan is best known for her synthesis of publicly available COVID-19 data in Ontario into a series of accessible graphs via her Twitter handle @jkwan_md, on a daily basis. Kwan also reports the daily number of recorded deaths, which notably, is omitted in daily updates from the Ontario Health Minister Christine Elliott's social media account.

Kwan co-founded the Masks4Canada group to advocate about the role of masks and face coverings in reducing COVID-19 transmission, and also co-founded the Doctors for Justice in Long-Term Care (Docs4LTCJustice) campaign to call on the Government of Ontario to take action to control the spread of COVID-19 in long-term care homes. She has spoken about different aspects of the COVID-19 pandemic, including the high levels of anxiety among Canadian doctors, the logistics of the COVID-19 vaccine roll-out across Ontario, and public health practices, for multiple media outlets.

References 

Canadian women physicians
Living people
McMaster University alumni
People from Burlington, Ontario
Physicians from Ontario
21st-century Canadian physicians
Year of birth missing (living people)